Walter Boyd (born 1 January 1972, in Kingston) is a retired football striker from Jamaica.

Nicknamed Blacka Pearl or The Pearl, Boyd was an extremely gifted yet controversial player whose off field antics always appeared to get him in trouble. Yet, his behavior on and off the field, combined with his great football skills earned him a cult-hero status with Jamaican football fans.

Club career
On club level he played for Jamaican sides Naggo Head and Constant Spring as well as for United States outfit Colorado Foxes and Welsh team Swansea City. While at Swansea he scored twice on his debut but also achieved the unusual distinction of coming on as a substitute and being sent off before play had even resumed. He signed again for Arnett Gardens after Naggo Head relegated to the Jamaican second division after the 2006/2007 seasons. On 8 February 2012 Walter Boyd returned to competitive football after more than two years out of the game, coming on as a substitute for Mountain View and inspiring them to a 4–1 win over Rae Town in a KSAFA Super League match at Excelsior.

International career
Boyd made his debut for the Reggae Boyz in 1991 and was capped over 60 times. He played three matches as a substitute at the 1998 FIFA World Cup. His final international match was a July 2001 friendly match against Saint Kitts and Nevis.

References

External links

 Profile at Reggaeboyzsc

1972 births
Living people
Sportspeople from Kingston, Jamaica
Association football forwards
Jamaican footballers
Jamaica international footballers
1991 CONCACAF Gold Cup players
1993 CONCACAF Gold Cup players
1998 FIFA World Cup players
American Professional Soccer League players
Colorado Foxes players
Arnett Gardens F.C. players
Swansea City A.F.C. players
Jamaican expatriate footballers
Jamaican expatriate sportspeople in Wales
Jamaican expatriate sportspeople in the United States
Expatriate footballers in Wales
Expatriate soccer players in the United States
English Football League players
Naggo Head F.C. players